New York Concerts: The Jimmy Giuffre 3 & 4 is a 2014 live album by saxophonist and clarinetist Jimmy Giuffre recorded on May 19, 1965, by Zev Feldman of Elemental Music.

Zev Feldman released a designed two-CD set entitled Jimmy Giuffre 3 & 4 New York Concerts. In each disc, each concert is recorded with informative booklet containing rare photographs and essays by Feldman, Giuffre's widow Juanita, the engineer George Klabin, guitarist Jim Hall, pianist Paul Bley and writers Phillip Carles and Bob Blumenthal.
The album contains sophisticated yet loose or free extemporizations which point out intriguing and unique Giuffre compositions. In addition, his interpretation of altoist Ornette Coleman's "Crossroads" features his agile, resonating clarinet spontaneously provoking by its rise and fall over bassist Richard Davis' fast, con arco phrases and drummer Joe Chambers' beat clusters.

Giuffre alternates between tenor sax and clarinet in the trio session, which was captured on September 3 at Judson Hall. “Drive” starts with his tenor’s buttery and thick tone over the rhythmic lines of the bandmates’ play. His duet with Davis also add a mysterious aura before a fiery group play.
The companionability among the three men makes them seamlessly blend individual ideas into a collective expression. For instance, "Qaudrangle" is a three way stream of consciousness conversation with Giuffre's poetic clarinet, Davis' expectant pizzicato and Chambers' intricate and angular thuds and thrums. Also it is one of the pieces that also appear on the quartet date from May 18 at Wollman Auditorium at Columbia University. Its earlier embodiment is more melodic with equally thrilling improvisations. "Cry,Want" is the bluesy track that opens with Giuffre's moaning clarinet building intricately woven captivating ad-lib lines around the main theme. As Chambers shuffling brushes, Giuffre's dramatic dialogue with Friedman evolves over bassist Barre Phillips echoing vibrations. As Friedman's rough yet captivating solo blends into Giuffre's melancholic longing play, the dark and mysterious conversation fades in out. Phillips and Chambers' careful conversation of play ominously placed silent pauses usher in the soulful coda.

Track listing
Disc 1
 Syncopate
 Intro
 Crossroads
 Drive
 Quadrangle
 Angles

Disc 2
 Syncopate
 Quadrangle
 Three Bars In One
 Cry, Want
 Angles
 Drive

Personnel

Jimmy Giuffre: tenor sax, clarinet
Joe Chambers: drums
Richard Davis: bass (Disc 1)
Barre Philips: bass (Disc 2)
Don Friedman: piano (Disc 2)

References

2014 albums
Jimmy Giuffre live albums